Kiki Bertens and Anne Keothavong were the defending champions, but Bertens chose not to participate. Keothavong partnered up with Alison Riske, but they lost in the first round to wildcards Antonia Lottner and Carina Witthöft.

Romina Oprandi and Amra Sadiković won the title, defeating Jill Craybas and Eva Hrdinová in the final, 4–6, 6–3, [10–7].

Seeds

Draw

References 
 Main draw

Buschl Open - Doubles
Ismaning Open